Panagiotis Sengiergis (born 23 June 2001) is a Greek professional footballer who plays as a left-back for Super League 2 club Iraklis.

References

2001 births
Living people
Greek footballers
Super League Greece players
Football League (Greece) players
Super League Greece 2 players
Aris Thessaloniki F.C. players
Iraklis Thessaloniki F.C. players
Association football defenders